Lepidoptera of Austria consist of both the butterflies and moths recorded from Austria.

Moths

Nepticulidae
Acalyptris loranthella (Klimesch, 1937)
Bohemannia pulverosella (Stainton, 1849)
Bohemannia quadrimaculella (Boheman, 1853)
Ectoedemia agrimoniae (Frey, 1858)
Ectoedemia albifasciella (Heinemann, 1871)
Ectoedemia angulifasciella (Stainton, 1849)
Ectoedemia arcuatella (Herrich-Schäffer, 1855)
Ectoedemia argyropeza (Zeller, 1839)
Ectoedemia atricollis (Stainton, 1857)
Ectoedemia caradjai (Groschke, 1944)
Ectoedemia cerris (Zimmermann, 1944)
Ectoedemia contorta van Nieukerken, 1985
Ectoedemia gilvipennella (Klimesch, 1946)
Ectoedemia hannoverella (Glitz, 1872)
Ectoedemia heringi (Toll, 1934)
Ectoedemia hexapetalae (Szocs, 1957)
Ectoedemia intimella (Zeller, 1848)
Ectoedemia klimeschi (Skala, 1933)
Ectoedemia liechtensteini (Zimmermann, 1944)
Ectoedemia mahalebella (Klimesch, 1936)
Ectoedemia minimella (Zetterstedt, 1839)
Ectoedemia occultella (Linnaeus, 1767)
Ectoedemia preisseckeri (Klimesch, 1941)
Ectoedemia rubivora (Wocke, 1860)
Ectoedemia rufifrontella (Caradja, 1920)
Ectoedemia spinosella (de Joannis, 1908)
Ectoedemia subbimaculella (Haworth, 1828)
Ectoedemia turbidella (Zeller, 1848)
Ectoedemia decentella (Herrich-Schäffer, 1855)
Ectoedemia louisella (Sircom, 1849)
Ectoedemia sericopeza (Zeller, 1839)
Ectoedemia septembrella (Stainton, 1849)
Ectoedemia viridissimella (Caradja, 1920)
Ectoedemia weaveri (Stainton, 1855)
Ectoedemia amani Svensson, 1966
Ectoedemia atrifrontella (Stainton, 1851)
Ectoedemia liebwerdella Zimmermann, 1940
Ectoedemia longicaudella Klimesch, 1953
Enteucha acetosae (Stainton, 1854)
Parafomoria helianthemella (Herrich-Schäffer, 1860)
Simplimorpha promissa (Staudinger, 1871)
Stigmella aceris (Frey, 1857)
Stigmella aeneofasciella (Herrich-Schäffer, 1855)
Stigmella alnetella (Stainton, 1856)
Stigmella anomalella (Goeze, 1783)
Stigmella assimilella (Zeller, 1848)
Stigmella atricapitella (Haworth, 1828)
Stigmella aurella (Fabricius, 1775)
Stigmella basiguttella (Heinemann, 1862)
Stigmella betulicola (Stainton, 1856)
Stigmella carpinella (Heinemann, 1862)
Stigmella catharticella (Stainton, 1853)
Stigmella centifoliella (Zeller, 1848)
Stigmella confusella (Wood & Walsingham, 1894)
Stigmella continuella (Stainton, 1856)
Stigmella crataegella (Klimesch, 1936)
Stigmella desperatella (Frey, 1856)
Stigmella dorsiguttella (Johansson, 1971)
Stigmella dryadella (O. Hofmann, 1868)
Stigmella eberhardi (Johansson, 1971)
Stigmella filipendulae (Wocke, 1871)
Stigmella floslactella (Haworth, 1828)
Stigmella freyella (Heyden, 1858)
Stigmella geimontani (Klimesch, 1940)
Stigmella glutinosae (Stainton, 1858)
Stigmella hahniella (Worz, 1937)
Stigmella hemargyrella (Kollar, 1832)
Stigmella hybnerella (Hübner, 1796)
Stigmella incognitella (Herrich-Schäffer, 1855)
Stigmella johanssonella A. & Z. Lastuvka, 1997
Stigmella lapponica (Wocke, 1862)
Stigmella lemniscella (Zeller, 1839)
Stigmella lonicerarum (Frey, 1856)
Stigmella luteella (Stainton, 1857)
Stigmella magdalenae (Klimesch, 1950)
Stigmella malella (Stainton, 1854)
Stigmella mespilicola (Frey, 1856)
Stigmella microtheriella (Stainton, 1854)
Stigmella minusculella (Herrich-Schäffer, 1855)
Stigmella myrtillella (Stainton, 1857)
Stigmella naturnella (Klimesch, 1936)
Stigmella nivenburgensis (Preissecker, 1942)
Stigmella nylandriella (Tengstrom, 1848)
Stigmella obliquella (Heinemann, 1862)
Stigmella oxyacanthella (Stainton, 1854)
Stigmella pallidiciliella Klimesch, 1946
Stigmella paradoxa (Frey, 1858)
Stigmella perpygmaeella (Doubleday, 1859)
Stigmella plagicolella (Stainton, 1854)
Stigmella poterii (Stainton, 1857)
Stigmella pretiosa (Heinemann, 1862)
Stigmella prunetorum (Stainton, 1855)
Stigmella pyri (Glitz, 1865)
Stigmella regiella (Herrich-Schäffer, 1855)
Stigmella rhamnella (Herrich-Schäffer, 1860)
Stigmella roborella (Johansson, 1971)
Stigmella rolandi van Nieukerken, 1990
Stigmella ruficapitella (Haworth, 1828)
Stigmella sakhalinella Puplesis, 1984
Stigmella salicis (Stainton, 1854)
Stigmella samiatella (Zeller, 1839)
Stigmella sanguisorbae (Wocke, 1865)
Stigmella sorbi (Stainton, 1861)
Stigmella speciosa (Frey, 1858)
Stigmella splendidissimella (Herrich-Schäffer, 1855)
Stigmella stelviana (Weber, 1938)
Stigmella thuringiaca (Petry, 1904)
Stigmella tiliae (Frey, 1856)
Stigmella tityrella (Stainton, 1854)
Stigmella tormentillella (Herrich-Schäffer, 1860)
Stigmella trimaculella (Haworth, 1828)
Stigmella ulmiphaga (Preissecker, 1942)
Stigmella ulmivora (Fologne, 1860)
Stigmella vimineticola (Frey, 1856)
Stigmella viscerella (Stainton, 1853)
Stigmella zangherii (Klimesch, 1951)
Trifurcula bleonella (Chretien, 1904)
Trifurcula headleyella (Stainton, 1854)
Trifurcula liskai A. & Z. Lastuvka, 2000
Trifurcula melanoptera van Nieukerken & Puplesis, 1991
Trifurcula thymi (Szocs, 1965)
Trifurcula cryptella (Stainton, 1856)
Trifurcula eurema (Tutt, 1899)
Trifurcula ortneri (Klimesch, 1951)
Trifurcula austriaca van Nieukerken, 1990
Trifurcula beirnei Puplesis, 1984
Trifurcula chamaecytisi Z. & A. Lastuvka, 1994
Trifurcula immundella (Zeller, 1839)
Trifurcula josefklimeschi van Nieukerken, 1990
Trifurcula moravica Z. & A. Lastuvka, 1994
Trifurcula pallidella (Duponchel, 1843)
Trifurcula serotinella Herrich-Schäffer, 1855
Trifurcula subnitidella (Duponchel, 1843)

Noctuidae
Abrostola asclepiadis (Denis & Schiffermuller, 1775)
Abrostola tripartita (Hufnagel, 1766)
Abrostola triplasia (Linnaeus, 1758)
Acontia lucida (Hufnagel, 1766)
Acontia trabealis (Scopoli, 1763)
Acosmetia caliginosa (Hübner, 1813)
Acronicta aceris (Linnaeus, 1758)
Acronicta leporina (Linnaeus, 1758)
Acronicta strigosa (Denis & Schiffermuller, 1775)
Acronicta alni (Linnaeus, 1767)
Acronicta cuspis (Hübner, 1813)
Acronicta psi (Linnaeus, 1758)
Acronicta tridens (Denis & Schiffermuller, 1775)
Acronicta auricoma (Denis & Schiffermuller, 1775)
Acronicta euphorbiae (Denis & Schiffermuller, 1775)
Acronicta menyanthidis (Esper, 1789)
Acronicta rumicis (Linnaeus, 1758)
Actebia praecox (Linnaeus, 1758)
Actebia multifida (Lederer, 1870)
Actebia fugax (Treitschke, 1825)
Actinotia polyodon (Clerck, 1759)
Actinotia radiosa (Esper, 1804)
Aedia funesta (Esper, 1786)
Aedia leucomelas (Linnaeus, 1758)
Aegle kaekeritziana (Hübner, 1799)
Agrochola lychnidis (Denis & Schiffermuller, 1775)
Agrochola helvola (Linnaeus, 1758)
Agrochola humilis (Denis & Schiffermuller, 1775)
Agrochola litura (Linnaeus, 1758)
Agrochola nitida (Denis & Schiffermuller, 1775)
Agrochola lota (Clerck, 1759)
Agrochola macilenta (Hübner, 1809)
Agrochola laevis (Hübner, 1803)
Agrochola circellaris (Hufnagel, 1766)
Agrotis bigramma (Esper, 1790)
Agrotis cinerea (Denis & Schiffermuller, 1775)
Agrotis clavis (Hufnagel, 1766)
Agrotis exclamationis (Linnaeus, 1758)
Agrotis fatidica (Hübner, 1824)
Agrotis ipsilon (Hufnagel, 1766)
Agrotis puta (Hübner, 1803)
Agrotis segetum (Denis & Schiffermuller, 1775)
Agrotis simplonia (Geyer, 1832)
Agrotis trux (Hübner, 1824)
Agrotis vestigialis (Hufnagel, 1766)
Allophyes oxyacanthae (Linnaeus, 1758)
Ammoconia caecimacula (Denis & Schiffermuller, 1775)
Amphipoea fucosa (Freyer, 1830)
Amphipoea lucens (Freyer, 1845)
Amphipoea oculea (Linnaeus, 1761)
Amphipyra berbera Rungs, 1949
Amphipyra livida (Denis & Schiffermuller, 1775)
Amphipyra perflua (Fabricius, 1787)
Amphipyra pyramidea (Linnaeus, 1758)
Amphipyra tetra (Fabricius, 1787)
Amphipyra tragopoginis (Clerck, 1759)
Amphipyra cinnamomea (Goeze, 1781)
Anaplectoides prasina (Denis & Schiffermuller, 1775)
Anarta myrtilli (Linnaeus, 1761)
Anarta dianthi (Tauscher, 1809)
Anarta melanopa (Thunberg, 1791)
Anarta odontites (Boisduval, 1829)
Anarta trifolii (Hufnagel, 1766)
Anorthoa munda (Denis & Schiffermuller, 1775)
Antitype chi (Linnaeus, 1758)
Apamea anceps (Denis & Schiffermuller, 1775)
Apamea aquila Donzel, 1837
Apamea crenata (Hufnagel, 1766)
Apamea epomidion (Haworth, 1809)
Apamea furva (Denis & Schiffermuller, 1775)
Apamea illyria Freyer, 1846
Apamea lateritia (Hufnagel, 1766)
Apamea lithoxylaea (Denis & Schiffermuller, 1775)
Apamea maillardi (Geyer, 1834)
Apamea monoglypha (Hufnagel, 1766)
Apamea oblonga (Haworth, 1809)
Apamea platinea (Treitschke, 1825)
Apamea remissa (Hübner, 1809)
Apamea rubrirena (Treitschke, 1825)
Apamea scolopacina (Esper, 1788)
Apamea sordens (Hufnagel, 1766)
Apamea sublustris (Esper, 1788)
Apamea syriaca (Osthelder, 1933)
Apamea unanimis (Hübner, 1813)
Apamea zeta (Treitschke, 1825)
Aporophyla lutulenta (Denis & Schiffermuller, 1775)
Aporophyla nigra (Haworth, 1809)
Apterogenum ypsillon (Denis & Schiffermuller, 1775)
Archanara dissoluta (Treitschke, 1825)
Archanara neurica (Hübner, 1808)
Arenostola phragmitidis (Hübner, 1803)
Asteroscopus sphinx (Hufnagel, 1766)
Atethmia ambusta (Denis & Schiffermuller, 1775)
Atethmia centrago (Haworth, 1809)
Athetis furvula (Hübner, 1808)
Athetis gluteosa (Treitschke, 1835)
Athetis pallustris (Hübner, 1808)
Athetis hospes (Freyer, 1831)
Athetis lepigone (Moschler, 1860)
Atypha pulmonaris (Esper, 1790)
Auchmis detersa (Esper, 1787)
Autographa aemula (Denis & Schiffermuller, 1775)
Autographa bractea (Denis & Schiffermuller, 1775)
Autographa buraetica (Staudinger, 1892)
Autographa gamma (Linnaeus, 1758)
Autographa jota (Linnaeus, 1758)
Autographa pulchrina (Haworth, 1809)
Axylia putris (Linnaeus, 1761)
Brachionycha nubeculosa (Esper, 1785)
Brachylomia viminalis (Fabricius, 1776)
Bryophila ereptricula Treitschke, 1825
Bryophila raptricula (Denis & Schiffermuller, 1775)
Bryophila ravula (Hübner, 1813)
Bryophila domestica (Hufnagel, 1766)
Calamia tridens (Hufnagel, 1766)
Calliergis ramosa (Esper, 1786)
Callopistria juventina (Stoll, 1782)
Callopistria latreillei (Duponchel, 1827)
Calophasia lunula (Hufnagel, 1766)
Calophasia opalina (Esper, 1793)
Calophasia platyptera (Esper, 1788)
Caradrina morpheus (Hufnagel, 1766)
Caradrina gilva (Donzel, 1837)
Caradrina clavipalpis Scopoli, 1763
Caradrina selini Boisduval, 1840
Caradrina aspersa Rambur, 1834
Caradrina kadenii Freyer, 1836
Caradrina montana Bremer, 1861
Caradrina terrea Freyer, 1840
Celaena haworthii (Curtis, 1829)
Ceramica pisi (Linnaeus, 1758)
Cerapteryx graminis (Linnaeus, 1758)
Cerastis rubricosa (Denis & Schiffermuller, 1775)
Charanyca trigrammica (Hufnagel, 1766)
Charanyca ferruginea (Esper, 1785)
Chersotis alpestris (Boisduval, 1837)
Chersotis cuprea (Denis & Schiffermuller, 1775)
Chersotis fimbriola (Esper, 1803)
Chersotis margaritacea (Villers, 1789)
Chersotis multangula (Hübner, 1803)
Chersotis ocellina (Denis & Schiffermuller, 1775)
Chersotis rectangula (Denis & Schiffermuller, 1775)
Chilodes maritima (Tauscher, 1806)
Chloantha hyperici (Denis & Schiffermuller, 1775)
Chrysodeixis chalcites (Esper, 1789)
Cleoceris scoriacea (Esper, 1789)
Coenobia rufa (Haworth, 1809)
Coenophila subrosea (Stephens, 1829)
Colocasia coryli (Linnaeus, 1758)
Conisania leineri (Freyer, 1836)
Conisania poelli Stertz, 1915
Conisania luteago (Denis & Schiffermuller, 1775)
Conistra ligula (Esper, 1791)
Conistra rubiginosa (Scopoli, 1763)
Conistra vaccinii (Linnaeus, 1761)
Conistra veronicae (Hübner, 1813)
Conistra erythrocephala (Denis & Schiffermuller, 1775)
Conistra rubiginea (Denis & Schiffermuller, 1775)
Coranarta cordigera (Thunberg, 1788)
Cosmia trapezina (Linnaeus, 1758)
Cosmia diffinis (Linnaeus, 1767)
Cosmia pyralina (Denis & Schiffermuller, 1775)
Cosmia affinis (Linnaeus, 1767)
Craniophora ligustri (Denis & Schiffermuller, 1775)
Cryphia fraudatricula (Hübner, 1803)
Cryphia receptricula (Hübner, 1803)
Cryphia algae (Fabricius, 1775)
Crypsedra gemmea (Treitschke, 1825)
Cucullia absinthii (Linnaeus, 1761)
Cucullia argentea (Hufnagel, 1766)
Cucullia artemisiae (Hufnagel, 1766)
Cucullia asteris (Denis & Schiffermuller, 1775)
Cucullia balsamitae Boisduval, 1840
Cucullia campanulae Freyer, 1831
Cucullia chamomillae (Denis & Schiffermuller, 1775)
Cucullia dracunculi (Hübner, 1813)
Cucullia fraudatrix Eversmann, 1837
Cucullia gnaphalii (Hübner, 1813)
Cucullia lactucae (Denis & Schiffermuller, 1775)
Cucullia lucifuga (Denis & Schiffermuller, 1775)
Cucullia scopariae Dorfmeister, 1853
Cucullia tanaceti (Denis & Schiffermuller, 1775)
Cucullia umbratica (Linnaeus, 1758)
Cucullia xeranthemi Boisduval, 1840
Cucullia blattariae (Esper, 1790)
Cucullia gozmanyi (G. Ronkay & L. Ronkay, 1994)
Cucullia lanceolata (Villers, 1789)
Cucullia lychnitis Rambur, 1833
Cucullia prenanthis Boisduval, 1840
Cucullia scrophulariae (Denis & Schiffermuller, 1775)
Cucullia verbasci (Linnaeus, 1758)
Dasypolia templi (Thunberg, 1792)
Deltote bankiana (Fabricius, 1775)
Deltote deceptoria (Scopoli, 1763)
Deltote uncula (Clerck, 1759)
Deltote pygarga (Hufnagel, 1766)
Denticucullus pygmina (Haworth, 1809)
Diachrysia chrysitis (Linnaeus, 1758)
Diachrysia chryson (Esper, 1789)
Diachrysia nadeja (Oberthur, 1880)
Diachrysia stenochrysis (Warren, 1913)
Diachrysia zosimi (Hübner, 1822)
Diarsia brunnea (Denis & Schiffermuller, 1775)
Diarsia dahlii (Hübner, 1813)
Diarsia florida (F. Schmidt, 1859)
Diarsia mendica (Fabricius, 1775)
Diarsia rubi (Vieweg, 1790)
Dichagyris flammatra (Denis & Schiffermuller, 1775)
Dichagyris musiva (Hübner, 1803)
Dichagyris candelisequa (Denis & Schiffermuller, 1775)
Dichagyris forcipula (Denis & Schiffermuller, 1775)
Dichagyris nigrescens (Hofner, 1888)
Dichagyris renigera (Hübner, 1808)
Dichagyris signifera (Denis & Schiffermuller, 1775)
Dichonia aeruginea (Hübner, 1808)
Dichonia convergens (Denis & Schiffermuller, 1775)
Dicycla oo (Linnaeus, 1758)
Diloba caeruleocephala (Linnaeus, 1758)
Dryobotodes carbonis Wagner, 1931
Dryobotodes eremita (Fabricius, 1775)
Dryobotodes monochroma (Esper, 1790)
Dypterygia scabriuscula (Linnaeus, 1758)
Egira conspicillaris (Linnaeus, 1758)
Elaphria venustula (Hübner, 1790)
Enargia abluta (Hübner, 1808)
Enargia paleacea (Esper, 1788)
Epilecta linogrisea (Denis & Schiffermuller, 1775)
Epipsilia grisescens (Fabricius, 1794)
Epipsilia latens (Hübner, 1809)
Episema glaucina (Esper, 1789)
Episema tersa (Denis & Schiffermuller, 1775)
Eremobia ochroleuca (Denis & Schiffermuller, 1775)
Eucarta amethystina (Hübner, 1803)
Eucarta virgo (Treitschke, 1835)
Euchalcia consona (Fabricius, 1787)
Euchalcia modestoides Poole, 1989
Euchalcia variabilis (Piller, 1783)
Eugnorisma glareosa (Esper, 1788)
Eugnorisma depuncta (Linnaeus, 1761)
Eugraphe sigma (Denis & Schiffermuller, 1775)
Euplexia lucipara (Linnaeus, 1758)
Eupsilia transversa (Hufnagel, 1766)
Eurois occulta (Linnaeus, 1758)
Euxoa aquilina (Denis & Schiffermuller, 1775)
Euxoa birivia (Denis & Schiffermuller, 1775)
Euxoa cos (Hübner, 1824)
Euxoa culminicola (Staudinger, 1870)
Euxoa decora (Denis & Schiffermuller, 1775)
Euxoa distinguenda (Lederer, 1857)
Euxoa eruta (Hübner, 1817)
Euxoa hastifera (Donzel, 1847)
Euxoa nigricans (Linnaeus, 1761)
Euxoa nigrofusca (Esper, 1788)
Euxoa obelisca (Denis & Schiffermuller, 1775)
Euxoa recussa (Hübner, 1817)
Euxoa segnilis (Duponchel, 1837)
Euxoa temera (Hübner, 1808)
Euxoa tritici (Linnaeus, 1761)
Euxoa vitta (Esper, 1789)
Fabula zollikoferi (Freyer, 1836)
Globia algae (Esper, 1789)
Globia sparganii (Esper, 1790)
Gortyna flavago (Denis & Schiffermuller, 1775)
Graphiphora augur (Fabricius, 1775)
Griposia aprilina (Linnaeus, 1758)
Hada plebeja (Linnaeus, 1761)
Hadena christophi (Moschler, 1862)
Hadena irregularis (Hufnagel, 1766)
Hadena perplexa (Denis & Schiffermuller, 1775)
Hadena albimacula (Borkhausen, 1792)
Hadena bicruris (Hufnagel, 1766)
Hadena caesia (Denis & Schiffermuller, 1775)
Hadena capsincola (Denis & Schiffermuller, 1775)
Hadena compta (Denis & Schiffermuller, 1775)
Hadena confusa (Hufnagel, 1766)
Hadena filograna (Esper, 1788)
Hadena magnolii (Boisduval, 1829)
Hadena tephroleuca (Boisduval, 1833)
Hecatera bicolorata (Hufnagel, 1766)
Hecatera dysodea (Denis & Schiffermuller, 1775)
Helicoverpa armigera (Hübner, 1808)
Heliothis adaucta Butler, 1878
Heliothis maritima Graslin, 1855
Heliothis nubigera Herrich-Schäffer, 1851
Heliothis ononis (Denis & Schiffermuller, 1775)
Heliothis peltigera (Denis & Schiffermuller, 1775)
Heliothis viriplaca (Hufnagel, 1766)
Helotropha leucostigma (Hübner, 1808)
Hoplodrina ambigua (Denis & Schiffermuller, 1775)
Hoplodrina blanda (Denis & Schiffermuller, 1775)
Hoplodrina octogenaria (Goeze, 1781)
Hoplodrina respersa (Denis & Schiffermuller, 1775)
Hoplodrina superstes (Ochsenheimer, 1816)
Hydraecia micacea (Esper, 1789)
Hydraecia petasitis Doubleday, 1847
Hydraecia ultima Holst, 1965
Hyppa rectilinea (Esper, 1788)
Hyssia cavernosa (Eversmann, 1842)
Ipimorpha contusa (Freyer, 1849)
Ipimorpha retusa (Linnaeus, 1761)
Ipimorpha subtusa (Denis & Schiffermuller, 1775)
Jodia croceago (Denis & Schiffermuller, 1775)
Lacanobia contigua (Denis & Schiffermuller, 1775)
Lacanobia suasa (Denis & Schiffermuller, 1775)
Lacanobia thalassina (Hufnagel, 1766)
Lacanobia aliena (Hübner, 1809)
Lacanobia oleracea (Linnaeus, 1758)
Lacanobia splendens (Hübner, 1808)
Lacanobia w-latinum (Hufnagel, 1766)
Lamprosticta culta (Denis & Schiffermuller, 1775)
Lamprotes c-aureum (Knoch, 1781)
Lasionycta imbecilla (Fabricius, 1794)
Lasionycta proxima (Hübner, 1809)
Lateroligia ophiogramma (Esper, 1794)
Lenisa geminipuncta (Haworth, 1809)
Leucania loreyi (Duponchel, 1827)
Leucania comma (Linnaeus, 1761)
Leucania obsoleta (Hübner, 1803)
Lithophane consocia (Borkhausen, 1792)
Lithophane furcifera (Hufnagel, 1766)
Lithophane lamda (Fabricius, 1787)
Lithophane ornitopus (Hufnagel, 1766)
Lithophane semibrunnea (Haworth, 1809)
Lithophane socia (Hufnagel, 1766)
Litoligia literosa (Haworth, 1809)
Luperina testacea (Denis & Schiffermuller, 1775)
Lycophotia molothina (Esper, 1789)
Lycophotia porphyrea (Denis & Schiffermuller, 1775)
Macdunnoughia confusa (Stephens, 1850)
Mamestra brassicae (Linnaeus, 1758)
Meganephria bimaculosa (Linnaeus, 1767)
Melanchra persicariae (Linnaeus, 1761)
Mesapamea remmi Rezbanyai-Reser, 1985
Mesapamea secalella Remm, 1983
Mesapamea secalis (Linnaeus, 1758)
Mesogona acetosellae (Denis & Schiffermuller, 1775)
Mesogona oxalina (Hübner, 1803)
Mesoligia furuncula (Denis & Schiffermuller, 1775)
Mesotrosta signalis (Treitschke, 1829)
Mniotype adusta (Esper, 1790)
Mniotype satura (Denis & Schiffermuller, 1775)
Mniotype solieri (Boisduval, 1829)
Moma alpium (Osbeck, 1778)
Mormo maura (Linnaeus, 1758)
Mythimna albipuncta (Denis & Schiffermuller, 1775)
Mythimna ferrago (Fabricius, 1787)
Mythimna l-album (Linnaeus, 1767)
Mythimna conigera (Denis & Schiffermuller, 1775)
Mythimna impura (Hübner, 1808)
Mythimna pallens (Linnaeus, 1758)
Mythimna pudorina (Denis & Schiffermuller, 1775)
Mythimna straminea (Treitschke, 1825)
Mythimna turca (Linnaeus, 1761)
Mythimna vitellina (Hübner, 1808)
Mythimna unipuncta (Haworth, 1809)
Mythimna andereggii (Boisduval, 1840)
Naenia typica (Linnaeus, 1758)
Noctua comes Hübner, 1813
Noctua fimbriata (Schreber, 1759)
Noctua interjecta Hübner, 1803
Noctua interposita (Hübner, 1790)
Noctua janthe (Borkhausen, 1792)
Noctua janthina Denis & Schiffermuller, 1775
Noctua orbona (Hufnagel, 1766)
Noctua pronuba (Linnaeus, 1758)
Noctua tirrenica Biebinger, Speidel & Hanigk, 1983
Nonagria typhae (Thunberg, 1784)
Nyctobrya muralis (Forster, 1771)
Ochropleura leucogaster (Freyer, 1831)
Ochropleura plecta (Linnaeus, 1761)
Oligia dubia (Heydemann, 1942)
Oligia fasciuncula (Haworth, 1809)
Oligia latruncula (Denis & Schiffermuller, 1775)
Oligia strigilis (Linnaeus, 1758)
Oligia versicolor (Borkhausen, 1792)
Omia cymbalariae (Hübner, 1809)
Omphalophana antirrhinii (Hübner, 1803)
Opigena polygona (Denis & Schiffermuller, 1775)
Orbona fragariae Vieweg, 1790
Oria musculosa (Hübner, 1808)
Orthosia gracilis (Denis & Schiffermuller, 1775)
Orthosia opima (Hübner, 1809)
Orthosia cerasi (Fabricius, 1775)
Orthosia cruda (Denis & Schiffermuller, 1775)
Orthosia miniosa (Denis & Schiffermuller, 1775)
Orthosia populeti (Fabricius, 1775)
Orthosia incerta (Hufnagel, 1766)
Orthosia gothica (Linnaeus, 1758)
Pabulatrix pabulatricula (Brahm, 1791)
Pachetra sagittigera (Hufnagel, 1766)
Panchrysia aurea (Hübner, 1803)
Panchrysia v-argenteum (Esper, 1798)
Panemeria tenebrata (Scopoli, 1763)
Panolis flammea (Denis & Schiffermuller, 1775)
Panthea coenobita (Esper, 1785)
Papestra biren (Goeze, 1781)
Paradiarsia punicea (Hübner, 1803)
Parastichtis suspecta (Hübner, 1817)
Peridroma saucia (Hübner, 1808)
Perigrapha i-cinctum (Denis & Schiffermuller, 1775)
Periphanes delphinii (Linnaeus, 1758)
Phlogophora meticulosa (Linnaeus, 1758)
Phlogophora scita (Hübner, 1790)
Photedes captiuncula (Treitschke, 1825)
Photedes extrema (Hübner, 1809)
Photedes fluxa (Hübner, 1809)
Photedes minima (Haworth, 1809)
Photedes morrisii (Dale, 1837)
Phragmatiphila nexa (Hübner, 1808)
Phyllophila obliterata (Rambur, 1833)
Plusia festucae (Linnaeus, 1758)
Plusia putnami (Grote, 1873)
Polia bombycina (Hufnagel, 1766)
Polia hepatica (Clerck, 1759)
Polia nebulosa (Hufnagel, 1766)
Polia serratilinea Ochsenheimer, 1816
Polychrysia moneta (Fabricius, 1787)
Polymixis flavicincta (Denis & Schiffermuller, 1775)
Polymixis polymita (Linnaeus, 1761)
Polymixis rufocincta (Geyer, 1828)
Polymixis xanthomista (Hübner, 1819)
Polyphaenis sericata (Esper, 1787)
Protolampra sobrina (Duponchel, 1843)
Protoschinia scutosa (Denis & Schiffermuller, 1775)
Pseudeustrotia candidula (Denis & Schiffermuller, 1775)
Pseudluperina pozzii (Curo, 1883)
Pyrrhia purpura (Hübner, 1817)
Pyrrhia umbra (Hufnagel, 1766)
Rhizedra lutosa (Hübner, 1803)
Rhyacia helvetina (Boisduval, 1833)
Rhyacia lucipeta (Denis & Schiffermuller, 1775)
Rhyacia simulans (Hufnagel, 1766)
Rileyiana fovea (Treitschke, 1825)
Schinia cardui (Hübner, 1790)
Schinia cognata (Freyer, 1833)
Scotochrosta pulla (Denis & Schiffermuller, 1775)
Sedina buettneri (E. Hering, 1858)
Senta flammea (Curtis, 1828)
Sesamia nonagrioides Lefebvre, 1827
Sideridis rivularis (Fabricius, 1775)
Sideridis kitti (Schawerda, 1914)
Sideridis reticulata (Goeze, 1781)
Sideridis lampra (Schawerda, 1913)
Sideridis turbida (Esper, 1790)
Simyra albovenosa (Goeze, 1781)
Simyra nervosa (Denis & Schiffermuller, 1775)
Spaelotis ravida (Denis & Schiffermuller, 1775)
Spaelotis senna (Freyer, 1829)
Spaelotis suecica (Aurivillius, 1890)
Spodoptera exigua (Hübner, 1808)
Standfussiana lucernea (Linnaeus, 1758)
Standfussiana wiskotti (Standfuss, 1888)
Staurophora celsia (Linnaeus, 1758)
Subacronicta megacephala (Denis & Schiffermuller, 1775)
Sympistis funebris (Hübner, 1809)
Sympistis nigrita (Boisduval, 1840)
Syngrapha ain (Hochenwarth, 1785)
Syngrapha devergens (Hübner, 1813)
Syngrapha hochenwarthi (Hochenwarth, 1785)
Syngrapha interrogationis (Linnaeus, 1758)
Thalpophila matura (Hufnagel, 1766)
Tholera cespitis (Denis & Schiffermuller, 1775)
Tholera decimalis (Poda, 1761)
Tiliacea aurago (Denis & Schiffermuller, 1775)
Tiliacea citrago (Linnaeus, 1758)
Tiliacea sulphurago (Denis & Schiffermuller, 1775)
Trachea atriplicis (Linnaeus, 1758)
Trichoplusia ni (Hübner, 1803)
Trichosea ludifica (Linnaeus, 1758)
Trigonophora flammea (Esper, 1785)
Tyta luctuosa (Denis & Schiffermuller, 1775)
Valeria jaspidea (Villers, 1789)
Valeria oleagina (Denis & Schiffermuller, 1775)
Xanthia gilvago (Denis & Schiffermuller, 1775)
Xanthia icteritia (Hufnagel, 1766)
Xanthia ocellaris (Borkhausen, 1792)
Xanthia togata (Esper, 1788)
Xestia ashworthii (Doubleday, 1855)
Xestia c-nigrum (Linnaeus, 1758)
Xestia ditrapezium (Denis & Schiffermuller, 1775)
Xestia triangulum (Hufnagel, 1766)
Xestia alpicola (Zetterstedt, 1839)
Xestia lorezi (Staudinger, 1891)
Xestia rhaetica (Staudinger, 1871)
Xestia sincera (Herrich-Schäffer, 1851)
Xestia speciosa (Hübner, 1813)
Xestia viridescens (Turati, 1919)
Xestia baja (Denis & Schiffermuller, 1775)
Xestia castanea (Esper, 1798)
Xestia collina (Boisduval, 1840)
Xestia ochreago (Hübner, 1809)
Xestia sexstrigata (Haworth, 1809)
Xestia stigmatica (Hübner, 1813)
Xestia xanthographa (Denis & Schiffermuller, 1775)
Xylena solidaginis (Hübner, 1803)
Xylena exsoleta (Linnaeus, 1758)
Xylena vetusta (Hübner, 1813)
Xylocampa areola (Esper, 1789)

Nolidae
Bena bicolorana (Fuessly, 1775)
Earias clorana (Linnaeus, 1761)
Earias vernana (Fabricius, 1787)
Meganola albula (Denis & Schiffermuller, 1775)
Meganola strigula (Denis & Schiffermuller, 1775)
Nola aerugula (Hübner, 1793)
Nola chlamitulalis (Hübner, 1813)
Nola cicatricalis (Treitschke, 1835)
Nola confusalis (Herrich-Schäffer, 1847)
Nola cristatula (Hübner, 1793)
Nola cucullatella (Linnaeus, 1758)
Nola subchlamydula Staudinger, 1871
Nycteola asiatica (Krulikovsky, 1904)
Nycteola degenerana (Hübner, 1799)
Nycteola revayana (Scopoli, 1772)
Nycteola siculana (Fuchs, 1899)
Pseudoips prasinana (Linnaeus, 1758)

Notodontidae
Cerura erminea (Esper, 1783)
Cerura vinula (Linnaeus, 1758)
Clostera anachoreta (Denis & Schiffermuller, 1775)
Clostera anastomosis (Linnaeus, 1758)
Clostera curtula (Linnaeus, 1758)
Clostera pigra (Hufnagel, 1766)
Dicranura ulmi (Denis & Schiffermuller, 1775)
Drymonia dodonaea (Denis & Schiffermuller, 1775)
Drymonia obliterata (Esper, 1785)
Drymonia querna (Denis & Schiffermuller, 1775)
Drymonia ruficornis (Hufnagel, 1766)
Drymonia velitaris (Hufnagel, 1766)
Furcula bicuspis (Borkhausen, 1790)
Furcula bifida (Brahm, 1787)
Furcula furcula (Clerck, 1759)
Gluphisia crenata (Esper, 1785)
Harpyia milhauseri (Fabricius, 1775)
Leucodonta bicoloria (Denis & Schiffermuller, 1775)
Notodonta dromedarius (Linnaeus, 1767)
Notodonta torva (Hübner, 1803)
Notodonta tritophus (Denis & Schiffermuller, 1775)
Notodonta ziczac (Linnaeus, 1758)
Odontosia carmelita (Esper, 1799)
Peridea anceps (Goeze, 1781)
Phalera bucephala (Linnaeus, 1758)
Phalera bucephaloides (Ochsenheimer, 1810)
Pheosia gnoma (Fabricius, 1776)
Pheosia tremula (Clerck, 1759)
Pterostoma palpina (Clerck, 1759)
Ptilodon capucina (Linnaeus, 1758)
Ptilodon cucullina (Denis & Schiffermuller, 1775)
Ptilophora plumigera (Denis & Schiffermuller, 1775)
Spatalia argentina (Denis & Schiffermuller, 1775)
Stauropus fagi (Linnaeus, 1758)
Thaumetopoea pityocampa (Denis & Schiffermuller, 1775)
Thaumetopoea processionea (Linnaeus, 1758)

Oecophoridae
Alabonia geoffrella (Linnaeus, 1767)
Alabonia staintoniella (Zeller, 1850)
Aplota nigricans (Zeller, 1852)
Aplota palpella (Haworth, 1828)
Batia internella Jackh, 1972
Batia lambdella (Donovan, 1793)
Batia lunaris (Haworth, 1828)
Bisigna procerella (Denis & Schiffermuller, 1775)
Borkhausenia fuscescens (Haworth, 1828)
Borkhausenia luridicomella (Herrich-Schäffer, 1856)
Borkhausenia minutella (Linnaeus, 1758)
Buvatina tineiformis Leraut, 1984
Crassa tinctella (Hübner, 1796)
Crassa unitella (Hübner, 1796)
Dasycera oliviella (Fabricius, 1794)
Decantha borkhausenii (Zeller, 1839)
Denisia augustella (Hübner, 1796)
Denisia nubilosella (Herrich-Schäffer, 1854)
Denisia rhaetica (Frey, 1856)
Denisia similella (Hübner, 1796)
Denisia stipella (Linnaeus, 1758)
Denisia stroemella (Fabricius, 1779)
Deuterogonia pudorina (Wocke, 1857)
Endrosis sarcitrella (Linnaeus, 1758)
Epicallima bruandella (Ragonot, 1889)
Epicallima formosella (Denis & Schiffermuller, 1775)
Esperia sulphurella (Fabricius, 1775)
Harpella forficella (Scopoli, 1763)
Herrichia excelsella Staudinger, 1871
Hofmannophila pseudospretella (Stainton, 1849)
Holoscolia huebneri Kocak, 1980
Kasyniana diminutella (Rebel, 1931)
Metalampra cinnamomea (Zeller, 1839)
Minetia adamczewskii (Toll, 1956)
Minetia criella (Treitschke, 1835)
Minetia crinitus (Fabricius, 1798)
Minetia labiosella (Hübner, 1810)
Oecophora bractella (Linnaeus, 1758)
Pleurota marginella (Denis & Schiffermuller, 1775)
Pleurota aristella (Linnaeus, 1767)
Pleurota bicostella (Clerck, 1759)
Pleurota proteella Staudinger, 1880
Pleurota pungitiella Herrich-Schäffer, 1854
Pleurota pyropella (Denis & Schiffermuller, 1775)
Pleurota punctella (O. Costa, 1836)
Schiffermuelleria schaefferella (Linnaeus, 1758)
Schiffermuelleria grandis (Desvignes, 1842)

Opostegidae
Opostega salaciella (Treitschke, 1833)
Opostega spatulella Herrich-Schäffer, 1855
Pseudopostega auritella (Hübner, 1813)
Pseudopostega crepusculella (Zeller, 1839)

External links
Fauna Europaea

M03
Austria03
Austria03